Petra Hynčicová (born 1 May 1994) is a Czech cross-country skier.

She competed in the women's 15 kilometre skiathlon at the 2018 Winter Olympics. She competed at the 2022 Winter Olympics, in Women's 10 kilometre classical, Women's 30 kilometre freestyle, Women's 15 kilometre skiathlon, Women's sprint, and Women's 4 × 5 kilometre relay.

Cross-country skiing results
All results are sourced from the International Ski Federation (FIS).

Olympic Games

World Championships

Season standings

References

External links
 

1994 births
Living people
Czech female cross-country skiers
Olympic cross-country skiers of the Czech Republic
Cross-country skiers at the 2018 Winter Olympics
Cross-country skiers at the 2022 Winter Olympics
Place of birth missing (living people)
Cross-country skiers at the 2012 Winter Youth Olympics
Universiade gold medalists for the Czech Republic
Universiade medalists in cross-country skiing
Competitors at the 2019 Winter Universiade
Sportspeople from Liberec